Rodney Michael John Cotterill Order of the Dannebrog (27 September 1933 – 24 June 2007) was an English-Danish physicist, and neuroscientist, who was educated at University College London (B.Sc., 1st), Yale (M.S.) and Cambridge University (Ph.D.). He spent most of his career as a professor at the Technical University of Denmark, Denmark, (1967-) after having spent five years as a researcher at the Argonne National Laboratory.

Scientific career
Cotterill was a prolific scientist who published over two hundred highly cited papers and books on a variety of topics in physics, biology and medicine. His initial research was in materials science, which was of such a high standard that he was subsequently elected to the Royal Danish Academy of Sciences and Letters. He became gradually more interested in biophysics, and especially the human brain, where he subsequently made important contributions to the study of consciousness.

He was awarded Knight, first class of the Dannebrog in 1994 and given an honorary D.Sc. in 1973 by London University in materials science. Cotterill was a Fellow of the Institute of Physics (U.K.) (1967), Fellow, Danish Academy of Technical Science (1974-, Presidium, 1985-7) and a Fellow of the Royal Danish Academy of Sciences and Letters (1984-, Presidium 1990-6). He was awarded the Hans and Ellen Hermer Memorial Prize in 1978 for his pioneering work in computer simulation.

His lectures at the Technical University of Denmark in Biophysics and Brain-Physics were popular among students. In 2001 he received the "Lecturer of the Year" award, nominated by students.

Life and other writings
Cotterill wrote widely for the general public and his first book The Cambridge Guide to the Material World was published to great critical acclaim.

Rodney Cotterill was born in Cornwall, near Jamaica Inn, Bolventor. In 1959, he married the Dane Vibeke Ejler Nielsen with whom he had two children Marianne and Jennifer, of which the former is a soprano singer and the latter has autism.

Books by Cotterill 
 Cotterill, R.M.J. (ed.), Computer Simulation in Brain Science, Cambridge University Press, 1988. 
 Cotterill, R.M.J. Autism, Intelligence and Consciousness, Munksgaard, 1994.
 Cotterill, R.M.J. (ed.), Models of Brain Function, Cambridge University Press, 1990. 
 Cotterill, R.M.J., Biophysics : An Introduction, Wiley, 2002. .

Books for the general public 
 Cotterill, R.M.J., The Cambridge Guide to the Material World, Cambridge University Press, 1985. ISBN
 Cotterill, R.M.J., No ghost in the machine: Modern science and the brain, the mind, and the soul, Heinemann, 1989. 
 Cotterill, R.M.J., Enchanted Looms : Conscious networks in brains and computer, Cambridge University Press, 1998. .
 Cotterill, R.M.J., The Material World, Cambridge University Press, 2008. .

Published scientific articles (incomplete)

References 

1933 births
2007 deaths
Consciousness researchers and theorists
Danish physicists
English physicists
Fellows of the Institute of Physics
People from Bodmin